Muharem Husković (born 5 March 2003) is an Austrian footballer currently playing as a forward for Austria Wien.

Personal life
Born in Austria, Husković is of Bosnian descent. His father hails from Čajniče and his mother hails from Brčko.

Career statistics

Club

Notes

References

2003 births
Living people
Austrian footballers
Austria youth international footballers
Association football midfielders
2. Liga (Austria) players
Kremser SC players
FK Austria Wien players
Austrian people of Bosnia and Herzegovina descent
Austrian people of Croatian descent